Paulo Gomes may refer to:

Paulo Gomes (footballer, born 1970), Portuguese footballer
Paulo Gomes (footballer, born 1975), Portuguese footballer
Paulo Gomes (athlete) (born 1973), long-distance runner who represented Portugal at the 2008 Summer Olympics
Paulo Gomes (racing driver) (born 1948), Brazilian racing driver
Paulo Jorge (footballer, born 1980) (Paulo Jorge Soares Gomes), Portuguese footballer